The SNCF  BB 8100  was a French class of 1500 V DC electric locomotives, used on the Paris-Lyon "Imperial" rail line. 

A post war development of the BB 300 class, they were much loved by the SNCF, 171 locomotives were built between 1948 and 1955. They were used to haul both freight and, later, passenger trains. Expansion of the 1500 V DC electrification in the 1980s allowed the locomotives to roam further than their original Paris-Lyon line. Most were withdrawn by 2003, though three locomotives were kept by SNCF Infrastructure to be hauled behind diesel locomotives, with their pantographs extended to dislodge ice build-up on the electrical wires. These final three were withdrawn from active service in 2011. 

They were also exported to other countries, including the Netherlands where they were designated class 1100.

The locomotives can be seen in action in the 1950s along the Paris-Lyon line in a promotional SNCF film "De Fils en Aiguilles".

References

BB 8100
1500 V DC locomotives
Standard gauge electric locomotives of France
B-B locomotives